Neil Fallon (born October 25, 1971) is an American musician, best known as the lead singer and occasional rhythm guitarist and keyboardist for the rock band Clutch. He is also the lead singer for The Company Band and Dunsmuir, and joined The Bakerton Group on guitar starting with their El Rojo album.

Fallon has provided guest vocals on the songs "Two Coins for Eyes" and "Empire's End" on the 2008 album Beyond Colossal by Swedish stoner rock band Dozer; "Crazy Horses" by Throat; "Slippin' Out" by Never Got Caught; "Mummies Wrapped in Money" by Lionize; and "Blood and Thunder" by Mastodon, on their 2004 album Leviathan; "Transistors of Mercy" by Polkadot Cadaver, on their 2013 album Last Call in Jonestown; "Ayatollah of Rock 'n' Rolla" by Soulfly, on their 2013 album Savages; and appears on the song "Die to Live" on Volbeat's seventh studio album Rewind, Replay, Rebound.

Fallon's younger sister Mary Alice Fallon-Yeskey appears on the Food Network show Ace of Cakes as office manager of Charm City Cakes in Baltimore, Maryland.

In September 2013, Fallon announced that Clutch would have to postpone their September tour (except for a hometown show in Baltimore, Maryland at the Shindig Festival), due to personal health issues. Fallon released a statement through the band's Facebook page saying "Dear friends, this week I've learned that a childhood injury to the neck, a genetic predisposition for spinal disease, and 20 some years of head banging will exact a toll. I've been diagnosed with an ugly case of cervical spinal stenosis and two herniated discs." Fallon had surgery on September 17, 2013 and the band resumed their tour in October. This ordeal inspired Fallon's lyrics in "Decapitation Blues", a track on Clutch's eleventh studio album, Psychic Warfare.

Fallon has a degree in English literature, as he graduated from the University of Maryland with a B.A. in English in 1993. He lives in Silver Spring, Maryland with his family.

References

External links

2007 Rock N Roll Universe interview
Interview by foundrymusic.com
Interview by labproductions.com
Interview by www.suicidegirls.com

1971 births
American male guitarists
American rock singers
American rock guitarists
Clutch (band) members
Living people
People from Maryland
Musicians from Portsmouth, Virginia
People from Silver Spring, Maryland
People from Virginia
Rhythm guitarists
Singers from Maryland
Guitarists from Maryland
21st-century American singers
21st-century American guitarists
21st-century American male singers
The Bakerton Group members